Wansapanataym Presents: Buhawi Jack (lit. Tornado Jack) is the first fantaserye offering in the Wansapanataym series aired on ABS-CBN. This series is based on the comic strip Buhawi Jack by Rod Santiago.

Cast and characters

Main cast
Gerald Anderson as Buhawi Jack/Jack Isidro
Jewel Mische as Vera Miranda
Rap Fernandez as Rex Vergara
Bugoy Cariño as Dino Isidro

Supporting cast
Phillip Salvador as Jaime Isidro
Joel Torre as Manuel Miranda
Yayo Aguila as Josie Isidro
Tetchie Agbayani as Mildred Vergara /Ferenze Escaño
Ricardo Cepeda as Roger Vergara
Julio Diaz as Mang Impe
Andre Tiangco as Arturo

See also
List of programs aired by ABS-CBN
Wansapanataym

References

External links

1998 films
2011 Philippine television series debuts
2011 Philippine television series endings
ABS-CBN drama series
Filipino-language television shows
Television series by Dreamscape Entertainment Television
Films directed by Dondon Santos